Beware of Loose Women is a 1929 German silent film directed by Siegfried Philippi and starring Rudolf Lettinger, André Mattoni, and Margarete Schön.

The film's art direction was by Gustav A. Knauer and Willy Schiller.

Cast

References

External links

1929 films
Films of the Weimar Republic
Films directed by Siegfried Philippi
German silent feature films
German black-and-white films